The Taiwan High Speed Rail Museum is a museum in Zhongli District, Taoyuan City, Taiwan.

History
The museum was opened on 5 January 2017 in a ceremony attended by Premier Lin Chuan and Transportation and Communications Minister Hochen Tan.

Exhibitions
The museum consists of 19 themed exhibitions, including those on the history and construction of the High Speed Rail, and those on train construction and repair, and other high-speed rail systems worldwide. It also features a driver's cab simulator and various interactive displays.

Transportation
The museum is accessible walking south-west from the Taoyuan Station of the Taiwan High Speed Rail.

See also
 List of museums in Taiwan

References

2017 establishments in Taiwan
Museums established in 2017
Museums in Taoyuan City
Railway museums in Taiwan
Taiwan High Speed Rail